"Handy Man" is a song written by singer Jimmy Jones and songwriter Otis Blackwell. Recordings by Del Shannon and also The Sparks Of Rhythm list Charles Merenstein as a co-writer, as does BMI. The Sparks Of Rhythm version on the Apollo 541 single version released in 1959 credits Andrew Barksdale and Merenstein as writers omitting Jimmy Jones.  The song is noted for Jones singing "Come-a, come-a come-a come-a, come come-a, yeah" lyrics, which are heard at the beginning as well as in the coda of the song, before the song's fade.

It was originally recorded by The Sparks Of Rhythm, a group Jones had been a member of when he wrote it, although he was not with them when they recorded it. That version was in a minor key, and had a completely different melody. When Jimmy Jones recorded it, the song was changed to a major key, with a completely different melody. In 1959, Jones recorded the song himself, in a version which had been reworked by Blackwell, who also produced the session. In addition, Blackwell also provided the whistling, which is prominently heard throughout the whole song. "Handy Man" became a million seller, reaching No. 3 on the R&B charts and No. 2 on the Billboard Hot 100 in 1960 behind Theme from A Summer Place by Percy Faith.

The song was a hit again in 1964, reaching No. 22 for Del Shannon and yet again in 1977 for James Taylor. Taylor's version peaked at No. 1 in September 1977 on the RPM Top Singles chart.

Measured in terms of popularity on any chart, Taylor's version of the song was the most successful. It reached No. 2 on the Cash Box Top 100 chart and No. 4 on the Billboard Hot 100.  It also hit No. 1 on the Adult Contemporary chart. Taylor's version also earned him his second Grammy Award for Best Male Pop Vocal Performance. Taylor's version featured Leah Kunkel as backup singer, singing the "comma comma" sections in harmony, which is heard after the second verse as well as in the coda of the song.

AllMusic critic Jason Elias compares Jones' original with Taylor's version stating that "where Jones’s version was chipper and a little obnoxious," Taylor's version "is so laid back it’s almost somnolent."  Elias notes that Taylor's slowed down version has the benefit of allowing him to shade the words in new ways.  Elias also praises Taylor's guitar playing.  Billboard described Taylor's version as "fluidly soft and laid back throughout" with spice added by the background harmonies.  Cash Box said that "Taylor lends his unmistakable voice to a song originally made famous by Jimmy Jones in 1960" and that "the arrangement is stretched out, the general tenor is mellow, and Peter Asher's production ear has kept all the sounds in a tasteful balance." Record World said that "Taylor's reading of it transforms the frantic pace of [Jones' and Shannon's] hits into a slow, considered ballad."

James Taylor version personnel
James Taylor – lead vocals, acoustic guitar, background vocals
Danny Kortchmar – electric guitar
Leland Sklar – bass guitar
Clarence McDonald – electric piano
Russell Kunkel – drums
Leah Kunkel – background vocals
Peter Asher – cabasa, congas

Other versions
Culture Club were accused of plagiarizing their 1983 hit "Karma Chameleon" from "Handy Man", for its apparent lifting of the "Comma, Comma" section. Culture Club frontman Boy George has denied consciously plagiarizing the song: "I might have heard it once, but it certainly wasn't something I sat down and said, 'Yeah, I want to copy this.'"

See also
List of number-one adult contemporary singles of 1977 (U.S.)

References

1959 songs
1964 singles
1977 singles
Del Shannon songs
James Taylor songs
American rock-and-roll songs
Grammy Award for Best Male Pop Vocal Performance
Songs written by Otis Blackwell
Song recordings produced by Peter Asher
Columbia Records singles
MGM Records singles
RPM Top Singles number-one singles